Route 23 is a west–east route in the western Massachusetts counties of Berkshire and Hampden. Prior to 1939, Route 23 was numbered as Route 17, which extended from Great Barrington to the New York state line.

Route description

Route 23 begins at the New York state border at Egremont, Massachusetts, as a continuation of New York State Route 23 from Hillsdale.  The road passes Catamount Ski Area and the village of South Egremont before merging with Route 41, just west of Great Barrington.  It passes the Egremont Country Club and the Great Barrington Airport before passing the eastern terminus of Route 71.  At this point the road becomes the Knox Trail.  From there the road heads towards the town center, merging with U.S. Route 7, following that road for one mile (1.6 km) before leaving Route 41, with Routes 7 and 23 turning eastward, crossing the Housatonic River.  
After another half-mile, U.S. Route 7 heads northward, leaving Route 23 to head eastward, this time combined with Route 183. (There is a Knox Trail marker at this point.) The two pass Butternut Basin Ski Area before crossing the Appalachian Trail and entering Monterey. Just east of the line, Route 183 heads south at the western terminus of Route 57, leaving Route 23 alone. From there, the road passes through Monterey, running parallel to and eventually crossing the Konkapot River near the center of town. The road passes Lake Garfield and Chestnut Hill before crossing into Otis. The road crosses through a section of Otis State Forest and passes the Otis Ridge Ski Area before merging for a short time with Route 8 through the town's center. From there, the road heads eastward again, passing between Big Pond, Benton Pond and the Otis Reservoir (this area is also the site of another Knox Trail marker) towards the Hampden County line and the town of Blandford. Once in Blandford, the road heads due east, passing Miller Swamp, Jackson Hill and Blair Pond before entering the town's center, at which point the road begins to runs parallel to the south of Interstate 90 (the Massachusetts Turnpike). Route 23 enters Russell, heading south of Punchbowl Mountain.

Major intersections

Gallery

References

Neilbert.com Massachusetts Route Log

023
Transportation in Berkshire County, Massachusetts
Transportation in Hampden County, Massachusetts